Kozanaq (also Romanized as Kanzanaq; also known as Gazang, Gonzanaq, Kanzana, Kanzanagh, and Kotarnaq) is a village in Esperan Rural District, in the Central District of Tabriz County, East Azerbaijan Province, Iran. At the 2006 census, its population was 156, in 33 families.

References 

Populated places in Tabriz County